Five Mile House may refer to:

 Five Mile House, Duntisbourne Abbots
 Five Mile House railway station